A Möbius resistor is an electrical component made up of two conductive surfaces separated by a dielectric material,  twisted 180° and connected to form a Möbius strip. As with the Möbius strip, once the Möbius resistor is connected up in this way it effectively has only one side and one continuous surface. 
Its connectors are attached at the same point on the circumference but on opposite surfaces. 
It provides a resistor with a reduced self-inductance, meaning that it can resist the flow of electricity in a more frequency-independent manner.

Transmission line
Due to a symmetrical construction, the voltage between the conductive sides of the Möbius resistor in the point equidistant to the feed point is exactly zero. This means that a short circuit placed at this point doesn't influence the characteristics of the device. Thus, the Möbius resistor can be thought of as two shorted lossy (resistive) transmission line segments, connected in parallel at the resistor's feed point.

Patents
 , Möbius capacitor
 , Non-inductive electrical resistor
 , Apparatus and method for minimizing electromagnetic emissions of technical emitters Dietrich Reichwein

See also
 Ayrton-Perry winding

References

External links
 R.L. Davis, Noninductive Resistor, collection of articles at rexresearch.com

Resistive components